Renwick Generating Plant, also known as the Municipal Steam Light Plant, is a historical industrial facility located in Renwick, Iowa, United States. G.L. Long was an engineer who was contracted in 1914 to design a steam-powered electrical light plant.  It first distributed energy on March 14, 1915, at 6:00 p.m.  The steam engines were replaced by a 75-horsepower, two-cylinder, semi-diesel engine and generating equipment manufactured by Fairbanks-Morse in 1922.  A 125-horsepower diesel engine manufactured by Worthington Pump and Machinery Corporation was added in 1936. At that time the plant started to supply power to a newly formed rural electric cooperative that was funded by the Rural Electrification Act of 1936.  A Faribanks-Morse 300-horsepower, four-cylinder diesel was added in 1939, and the 75-horsepower and 40-horsepower engines were replaced in 1942 by another 300-horsepower diesel.  An addition was added onto the north side of the building the same year.  It housed the local fire department and city hall.  The facility was listed as a historic district on the National Register of Historic Places in 1995.

The plant is a single-story, rectangular building that was built of concrete block manufactured in Renwick. It is a contributing building in the historic district.  Contributing structures include the three engines, a transformer substation bank, a cooling tower, a water tower, and a utility shed.

References

Industrial buildings completed in 1915
Industrial buildings and structures on the National Register of Historic Places in Iowa
Historic districts on the National Register of Historic Places in Iowa
Buildings and structures in Humboldt County, Iowa
National Register of Historic Places in Humboldt County, Iowa